Artists for Charity is a 501(c)3 non-profit organization devoted to raising awareness and securing funds for humanitarian causes. It is made up of artists and individuals from all over the world who not only volunteer time, but also donate their precious artwork for the sake of change.

Operations 
Artists for Charity uses both mainstream and social media platforms to raise awareness, including holiday benefits and events arranged via Facebook.

Mission 
Artists For Charity (AFC) is founded on the belief that all people, regardless of place of birth, sex, or current medical condition, are entitled to certain basic rights, especially education and healthcare, but that the burden of ensuring that these rights are granted rests equally with society.

Its objective is to support the peripheral members of communities, those who lack the means to support themselves. AFC executes its own projects in developing nations where services for such persons are limited, and also supplements basic care and education for the less fortunate in developed nations. Stating that consciousness is the first step towards action, AFC campaigns to educate so that individuals may also contribute towards these goals.

Projects 
The Artists for Charity Children’s Home, located in Addis Ababa, provides exceptional care for 16 children that have lost both parents to HIV/AIDS. The AFC Children’s Home includes a dormitory bedroom, 2 kitchens, dining room, medicine room, and study room. In order to provide to ensure proper medical care, a nurse oversees the medicine dosing regimen and attends to minor illnesses and non-emergency first aid details. Because of the immune-suppressed status of the children, a sterile environment is maintained as much as possible. AFC ensures that all living arrangements are provided, including supplying clothing, toiletries, personal items, beds, bedclothes, transportation costs, school costs and supplies, medical appointments, and medicines.

The criteria for accepting children to the AFC home are:
 HIV positive children between the ages of 8 and 15, and
 Children who have been orphaned by both parents.
 Children in extenuating circumstances, such as extreme impoverishment or abuse (physical, sexual, or mental), regardless of age.

References

External links
 artistsforcharity.org Official website.
  Artists for Charity: U.S. student heads to Ethiopia to help HIV-positive orphans, Tadias News, January 16, 2009
  Artists for Charity (DC) Blog
  Party with a Purpose, September 17 2009. Artists for Charity Benefit San Francisco , Current, September 4, 2009

Non-profit organizations based in Georgia (U.S. state)